Ramon Arcas Cárdenas (born 25 January 1991) is a Spanish footballer who plays for SCR Peña Deportiva mainly as a midfielder.

Club career
Born in Águilas, Region of Murcia, Arcas played for three clubs as a youth, including hometowns' Águilas CF. He finished his formation at Racing de Santander in 2010, then started playing as a senior with the reserve team in Tercera División.

On 9 January 2011, Arcas made his debut with Racing's main squad, starting in a 1–1 La Liga home draw against Sporting de Gijón and featuring 80 minutes. In August he signed for Segunda División side Recreativo de Huelva, appearing in his first official game with his new team on the 27th against Deportivo de La Coruña (45 minutes played, 0–1 away loss).

On 3 January 2013, Arcas terminated his contract with the Andalusians and joined FC Cartagena from Segunda División B. On 6 October he moved to another reserve team, Getafe CF B in the same level.

After appearing regularly for the Madrid outskirts club, Arcas returned to Cartagena on 27 June 2014.

References

External links

1991 births
Living people
People from Águilas
Spanish footballers
Footballers from the Region of Murcia
Association football midfielders
La Liga players
Segunda División players
Segunda División B players
Tercera División players
Rayo Cantabria players
Racing de Santander players
Recreativo de Huelva players
FC Cartagena footballers
Getafe CF B players
Spanish expatriate footballers
Expatriate footballers in Portugal
Spanish expatriate sportspeople in Portugal
Águilas FC players